Selene Vigil (born July 16, 1965) is an American singer. She co-founded grunge band 7 Year Bitch alongside Elizabeth Davis, Valerie Agnew and Stefanie Sargent in 1990; they released three studio albums before disbanding in 1997. In 2000, Vigil formed a gothic band, Cistine. In 2010, Vigil released her debut solo album, That Was Then.

Vigil was married to Rage Against the Machine's drummer, Brad Wilk.  They have two children.

Discography 
7 Year Bitch

Albums 
Sick 'Em (C/Z Records, 1992).
¡Viva Zapata! (C/Z Records, 1994).
Gato Negro (Atlantic Records, 1996).

Singles/EPs 
"Lorna" b/w "No Fucking War," "You Smell Lonely" (Rathouse/Face The Music Records), (1991; reissued by C/Z Records in 1992).
"Antidisestablishmentarianism EP" (Rugger Bugger Records, 1992)
"7 Year Bitch" / "Thatcher on Acid" "Can We Laugh Now?" / "No Fucking War" (Clawfist Records, 1992)
"7 Year Bitch EP" (C/Z Records, 1992)
"Rock-A-Bye Baby" b/w "Wide Open Trap" (C/Z Records, 1994)
"The History of My Future" b/w "24,900 Miles Per Hour" (promo only) (Atlantic Records, 1996)
"24,900 Miles Per Hour" (promo only) (Atlantic Records, 1996)
"Miss Understood" b/w "Go!" (Man's Ruin, 1996)

Other contributions 
 "8-Ball Deluxe" on Kill Rock Stars (Kill Rock Stars, Nov '12).
 "Dead Men Don't Rape" on There's A Dyke in the Pit (Outpunk/Harp Records, 1992).
 "The Scratch" on Power Flush: San Francisco, Seattle & You (Rathouse/Broken Rekids, 1993).
 "In Lust You Trust" on Rawk Atlas (promo only) (C/Z Records, 1993).
 "Dead Men Don't Rape" on Progression (Progression, 1994).
 "The Scratch," "Icy Blue" on the Mad Love Motion Picture Soundtrack (Zoo Records, 1995).
 "Kiss My Ass Goodbye" on Seattle Women in Rock: A Diverse Collection (Insight Records, 1995).
 "Damn Good And Well" on Space Mountain (Rough Trade Publishing, 1995).
 "The Scratch" on Take A Lick (promo only) (BMG, 1995).
 "M.I.A." on Notes From The Underground, Vol. 2 (Priority Records, 1995).
 "Mad Dash" on Home Alive: The Art Of Self-Defense (Epic Records, 1996).
 "24,900 Miles Per Hour" on huH Music Sampler No. 23 (promo only, RayGun Press, 1996).
 "Knot (Live)" on Hype! The Motion Picture Soundtrack (Sub Pop Records, 1996).
 "Damn Good And Well" on Rough Cuts: The Best Of Rough Trade Publishing, 1991–1995 (Rough Trade Publishing, 1997).
 "Rock-A-Bye Baby" on She's A Rebel (Beloved/Shanachie Records, 1997).
 "Shake Appeal" on We Will Fall: The Iggy Pop Tribute (Royalty Records, 1997).
 "M.I.A." on Whatever: The 90's Pop & Culture Box (Flying Rhino Records/WEA, 2005).
 "The Scratch" on Sleepless in Seattle: The Birth Of Grunge (LiveWire Recordings, 2006).

Music videos 
"In Lust You Trust" (1992)
"Hip Like Junk" (1994)
"24,900 Miles Per Hour" (1996)

Solo

Albums 
That Was Then (Tuck & Roll Music, 2010)
Tough Dance (2017)

Filmography

Film 
The Gits Movie (2005)
Hype! (1996)
Mad Love (1995)

References 

American women singers
Feminist musicians
1965 births
Living people
7 Year Bitch members
21st-century American women